Mika Schneider (born 30 August 2001) is a French fashion model. She appeared on a cover of American Vogue in April 2020. Models.com currently ranks her as one of the Top 50 models.

Early life 
Schneider was born in Paris, France, to a French father and Japanese mother. Schneider moved frequently between France and Japan as well as living in Moscow, Russia, and Chennai, India; she speaks French, Japanese, English, and additionally some Russian and German.

Career 
While living in India, Schneider's mother sent photos of her to Japanese modeling agency Bon Image, while Elite Model Management's French division scouted her through Instagram.

Schneider debuted at Prada's S/S 2020 fashion show and modeled as the bride in Tom Ford's Los Angeles fashion show. In 2021, she had walked in over 30 shows, more shows than any model during Fashion Week, including Chanel, Saint Laurent, Miu Miu, Dior, Prada, Versace, Fendi, Tom Ford, and Louis Vuitton. She appeared on two group covers of Vogue Japan,  who called her a "rising star". She also appeared on the cover of i-D with Italian model Maty Fall. She appeared on the cover of the February 2022 issue of Vogue France. In advertisements, she has appeared in campaigns for Chanel, Moncler, Zara, Loewe, Givenchy, Valentino, Saint Laurent, Versace, and Hermès.

Schneider was the readers' choice for "Breakout Star of the Year" for the 2020 Model of the Year Awards on models.com. In 2022, she was chosen as one of The Next Icons by Harper's Bazaar.

References 

Living people
2001 births
Models from Paris
People from Tokyo
French female models
Japanese female models
French people of Japanese descent
Japanese people of French descent
French expatriates in India
Japanese expatriates in India
French expatriates in Russia
Japanese expatriates in Russia
The Society Management models